Bad Newz Travels Fast is the only studio album by American rapper/producer DJ Pooh. It was released July 15, 1997 on Atlantic Records and was produced by DJ Pooh himself.  It spawned the single, "Whoop! Whoop!", and featured guests such as Kam, Charlie Wilson, Tray Dee, Bad Azz, Roger Troutman, Val Young and Mista Grimm. The album peaked at #116 on the Billboard 200 on August 2, 1997 and spent 3 weeks on the chart.

Critical reception 

 Allmusic – "Although the sound of the record is superb, there are only a handful of fully realized songs on the album."
 The Source – "Aiming to inject his jovial brand of P-Funk to the world, this compilation follows the lead of his work on Snoop Doggy Dogg's Doggfather."

Track listing

References

External links 
 [ Bad Newz Travels Fast] at Allmusic
 Bad Newz Travels Fast at Discogs
 Bad Newz Travels Fast at Tower Records

DJ Pooh albums
1997 debut albums
Albums produced by DJ Pooh
Atlantic Records albums